Howard Loxton is a British theatre critic and writer.  Loxton is currently a theatre critic for The British Theatre Guide.

Loxton was born in Birmingham, England in 1934.  He received an MA in modern drama.

Loxton previously worked as an stage and television actor and as stage manager of the English Opera Group.  Loxton co-founded a journal about television, called Viewpoint, and worked as a freelance journalist, having interviews published in The Guardian and other media outlets.  Loxton has also worked as an editor for publishers Paul Hamlyn and Jonathan Cape. He supervises the annual Theatre Book Prize for the Society for Theatre Research.

Loxton is the author of several books on theatre and history, including:
Shakespeare Country 2000
The Golden Age of the Circus 1997
Theatre 1989	
Shakespeare's Theatre 1994
The Murder of Thomas Becket 1971
The Battle of Agincourt 1968
Christmas 1992
The Assassination of President Kennedy (with Michael Rand and Len Deighton) 1967
Railways 1963
Westminster Abbey (with Lawrence Edward Tanner and Nicholas H. MacMichael) 1971
Mazes and Labyrinths (with Adrian Fisher) 2000
Garden: Celebration 1991
Encyclopedia of Saints 1996
Pilgrimage to Canterbury 1978
The Art of Angels 1995	
Secrets of the Maze: An Interactive Guide to the World's Most Amazing Mazes (with Adrian Fisher) 2008

Loxton has also authored books  about dogs, birds, horses, and cats.
The Beauty of Cats 1972
Beautiful Cats 1980 
The Beauty of Big Cats 1973
A Superguide to Cats 1989
Guide to Cats of the World 1977
Caring for Your Cat 1989
The Cat Repair Handbook: the Practical Guide to Feline Health Care 1985
Noble Cat: Aristocrat of the Animal World 2000
Encyclopedia of the Cat (with Angela Rixon) 2002
Guide to Cats of the World 1991
In Search of Cats 1976
Spotter's Guide to Cats 2001
Cats and Kittens 1984
Cats: An Exeter Leisure Guide 1981
99 Lives: Cats in History, Legend, and Literature 1999

Loxton's books have been translated into German, French, and Italian.

References 

British theatre critics
Living people
1934 births